FDX may refer to:
 FedEx Corporation, original FDX Corporation, American logistics services company
 FedEx Express, the ICAO code FDX, American cargo airline

Computing:
 FDX, an expansion pack for the 1980s Memotech MTX computer
 .fdx, the filename extension for Final Draft files
 Fetch-decode-execute cycle, or FDX, basic operation cycle of a computer
 Fast Data eXchange, a proprietary communication protocol used on boats

Telecommunications:
 Full-duplex, communication circuit